Knefastia crassinoda is an extinct species of sea snail, a marine gastropod mollusk in the family Pseudomelatomidae, the turrids and allies.

Description

Distribution
This extinct marine species was found in Stampien strata in the Basses-Pyrénées, France.

References

 Desmoulins M., 1842: Revision de quelques espèces de Pleurotomes, in-8°, Bordeaux, 1842, p. 60, n° 47
 Cossmann (M.) & Pissarro (G.), 1913 - Iconographie complète des coquilles fossiles de l'Éocène des environs de Paris, t. 2, p. pp. 46–65

crassinoda
Gastropods described in 1842